Qax İngiloy (also, Qaxingiloy, Kakh Ingilo, Kakh-Bash-Ingiloy, and Kakhingiloy) is a village and municipality in the Qakh Rayon of Azerbaijan.  It has a population of 1,792.

References 

Populated places in Qakh District